Binibining Pilipinas 1998 was the 35th edition of Binibining Pilipinas. It took place at the Smart Araneta Coliseum in Quezon City, Metro Manila. Philippines on March 15, 1998.
 
At the end of the event, Abbygale Arenas crowned Tisha Silang as Binibining Pilipinas Universe 1998, Kristine Florendo crowned Rachel Soriano as Binibining Pilipinas World 1998, and Susan Jane Ritter crowned Colette Centeno as Binibining Pilipinas International 1998. Jewel May Lobaton was named First Runner-Up, while Elsie Sicat was named Second Runner-Up. 
 
Tisha Silang later had to resign because of citizenship issues and was replaced by Jewel May Lobaton.

Results
Color keys
  The contestant was a Semi-Finalist in an International pageant.
  The contestant did not place.

Special Awards

Contestants
29 contestants competed for the three titles.

Notes

Post-pageant Notes 

 Tisha Silang resigned as Binibining Pilipinas-Universe 1998 due to citizenship issues and was replaced by Jewel May Lobaton. Lobaton competed in Miss Universe 1998 in Honolulu, Hawaii but was unplaced. The original placement of Lobaton was given to Elsie Sicat, the Second Runner-Up, while the Second Runner-Up position was given to Esabela Cabrera, one of the semifinalists.
 Rachel Soriano was unplaced when she competed at Miss World 1998 in Mahé Island, Seychelles. On the other hand, Colette Centeno was one of the 15 semifinalists at Miss International 1998 in Tokyo, Japan.

References

 
1998
1998 beauty pageants